New Youngs SC is a Sri Lankan professional football club based in Wennappuwa. The club competes in the highest domestic football league, the Sri Lanka Champions League.

The club was established by Rohitha Fernando in Wennappuwa. In 1990, the club finished as champions of the third division. In 1994, they emerged as second division champions, a feat they repeated in 1996, which led to the team's promotion to the first division. In 2005, New Youngs SC reached the semi-final of the national FA Cup, where they were defeated 2–0 by Saunders.

External links 

Football clubs in Sri Lanka